Springwell railway station served Springwell Village, Tyne and Wear, England, from 1844 to 1871 on the Durham Coast Line.

History 
The station opened in August 1844 by the Brandling Junction Railway. It was situated 300 yards west of Mill Lane bridge. It closed on 1 March 1872 when the line from Pelaw to South Shields opened. The signal box was still extant in the 1970s.

References

External links 

Disused railway stations in Tyne and Wear
Railway stations opened in 1844
Railway stations closed in 1872
1844 establishments in England
1872 disestablishments in England

Railway stations in Great Britain opened in 1844